The women's 3000 metres steeplechase at the 2010 African Championships in Athletics were held on July 31.

Results

External links
Results

3000
Steeplechase at the African Championships in Athletics
2010 in women's athletics